The Gethsemane Option is a 2013 album by The Legendary Pink Dots. It is the first album by The Legendary Pink Dots to be released on Metropolis Records.

The CD back cover only features the band name, album title, and track listing.

After release, elements of the album cover art made by Vera Poimenvona were found to plagiarised, taken from Joachim Luetke's cover for album Obzen by Meshuggah.

Track listing

References

External links 
Official LPD web-site - May New Letter
Album page on Metropolis

The Legendary Pink Dots albums
2013 albums